Ryuichi Oda (born 12 December 1976) is a Japanese professional golfer who currently competes on the Japan Golf Tour.

Oda was born in Kagoshima Prefecture. He spent much of his amateur career developing his skills at the Kagoshima Country Club. He competed in two Japan Golf Tour events in 2002 (Token Corporation Cup and Tsuruya Open) and despite missing the cut on both occasions, became a professional in time for the Fujisankei Classic where he once again failed to get past the second day. It was not until the Diamond Cup Tournament before he made his first cut, finishing T55.

It was not until the 2009 Japan Open that Oda shot to fame. He only just avoided being cut after two rounds and by round three was tied for 5th place. He went on to beat Ryo Ishikawa and Yasuharu Imano in a three-man playoff. Oda would win on the Japan Golf Tour again in 2014, when he took victory at the Mynavi ABC Championship. He would handily by 5 strokes over Koumei Oda and Hideto Tanihara.

Professional wins (3)

Japan Golf Tour wins (2)

 The Japan Open Golf Championship is also a Japan major championship.

Japan Golf Tour playoff record (1–0)

Other wins (1)
2016 Kyusyu Open

Results in major championships

Note: Oda only played in The Open Championship.
CUT = missed the half-way cut

External links

Japanese male golfers
Japan Golf Tour golfers
Sportspeople from Kagoshima Prefecture
1976 births
Living people